Bird Homestead, also known as the Bouton-Bird-Erikson Homestead, is a historic home and farm complex located in Rye, Westchester County, New York. It is owned by the city of Rye and was purchased in 2009. The property is situated on Blind Brook estuary, off the Long Island Sound. The property is adjacent to the Rye Meeting House.  The main part of the house was built in 1835, and is a two-story, three-bay wide frame building in the Greek Revival style.  It sits on a brick foundation and has a low-pitched, side gable roof.  It features a one-story, full-width, front porch.  Also on the property are a contributing two-story barn built in the 1880s and a long, one-story outbuilding.

It was added to the National Register of Historic Places in 2010. It is operated along with the adjacent Rye Meeting House, by the not-for-profit Committee to Save the Bird Homestead.

The home was owned by five generations of the Bouton-Bird-Erikson family for over 150 years. Henry Bird was renowned entomologist; his sons Roland and Junius were pioneers in the fields of paleontology and archaeology, respectively. Many of their discoveries can be seen at the American Museum of Natural History. Henry's daughter Alice Bird Erikson was an accomplished nature illustrator while Doris Bird spent more than forty years as the children's librarian at the Rye Free Reading Room.

See also
National Register of Historic Places listings in southern Westchester County, New York

References

Houses on the National Register of Historic Places in New York (state)
Greek Revival houses in New York (state)
Houses completed in 1835
Houses in Westchester County, New York
Buildings and structures in Rye, New York
National Register of Historic Places in Westchester County, New York